Brigitte Lahaie (born Brigitte Lucie Jeanine Van Meerhaeghe; 12 October 1955) is a French radio talk show host, mainstream film actress and former pornographic actress. She performed in erotic films from 1976 through 1980 and is a member of the XRCO Hall of Fame.

Early life and background
Brigitte Lucie Jeanine Van Meerhaeghe was born in Tourcoing, France. She left home for Paris when 18 years old, where she started working as a shoe salesgirl. Soon, she was noticed for her physique and accepted a proposal to pose in the nude for erotic magazines.

Cinema

Porn
She started working in the adult film industry in 1976, one year after the legalization of hardcore pornography in France, as "Brigitte Lahaie" and various other stage names. In her first film she was a body double for some of another actress' scenes.

She chose to be listed as "Brigitte Lahaie" in most of them, her surname a transfer to French of her Flemish name "vanmeerhaeghe", in which "haeghe" means "hedge", since "la haie" is "the hedge" in French.

Horror
While she was still working in the adult-movie industry, Jean Rollin, who had directed her in the porn film Vibrations Sensuelles (Sensual Vibrations) in 1976, noticed Lahaie's "distinctly different personality," as he later recalled, and thought she had "incredible charisma." He offered her a role in his 1978 mainstream film, Les Raisins de la Mort (Grapes of Death), the first gore film produced in France, with Marie-Georges Pascal in the leading role. He then made her the protagonist of his next film, Fascination, in 1979.

Mainstream
Lahaie appeared in I as in Icarus (1980), which starred Yves Montand, playing a stripper, in For a Cop's Hide (1981), which starred Alain Delon, in the role of a nurse.  She continued to also make softcore and Nazi exploitation movies as well as "video nasties" during this time. In 1987, she played a singer in Michel Denisot's television special "La Plus Belle Nuit du Cinéma" ("The Most Beautiful Night of the Cinema"), transmitted from the Zénith.

The same year, she recorded and released the single "Caresse tendresse" ("Caress tenderness").

According to a 2018 article in Sight & Sound about Jean Rollin, Lahaie plays in his La Nuit des Traquées (Night of the Hunted, 1980) the woman suffering from amnesia with "devastating effect," while she is credited with "lovely, open, untutored performances" for her work in Les Raisins and Fascination.

Lahaie acted in several other mainstream films, including Henry & June (1990) and Calvaire (2004).

Books and radio
Throughout her career, Lahaie published several books, mostly autobiographical, as well as some novels. In the 2000s, she was often featured on the Les Grosses Têtes radio program, broadcast on RTL, while she was also, from 2001, the host of Lahaie, l'Amour et Vous on Radio Monte Carlo, a daily talk show from 14:00 to 16:00 that dealt mostly with love and sex. The show ended in 2016, with the station praising her work on the subject of sexuality as "unique" in terms of success and longevity.

Personal life
Lahaie has two sons, with only the first name, Patrick, of her partner being known. She lives in a country estate, near Paris.

She is a fan of equestrianism, an interest reportedly first inspired when she saw the film White Mane as a teenager. She commentated live on the equestrian events at the 2012 London Olympics for RMC.

Sexual violence and consent
In the aftermath of the Harvey Weinstein scandal and the subsequent Me Too movement, one hundred women in France signed, on 9 January 2018, a public declaration in which they denounced what they claimed was a return to "puritanism" that "actually serves the interests of the enemies of sexual freedom, the religious extremists, the worst reactionaries." Lahaie was a co-signatory of that declaration, along with other celebrities such as Catherine Deneuve, Ingrid Caven, and Catherine Millet. Lahaie went on a TV debate the same evening, where she stated that women could have an orgasm when being raped. A few months later, in May, Lahaie stated, in interviews and on television, that her comment was "taken out of context," that she "does not regret [it]", and that she never supported non-consensual sex or violence of any kind against women.

Filmography

Film

Television

Short films

Bibliography

See also
 Golden Age of Porn
 List of porn stars who appeared in mainstream films

References

Further reading

External links
 
 
 
 

French pornographic film actresses
French film actresses
French radio presenters
French women radio presenters
1955 births
Living people
People from Tourcoing
20th-century French actresses